Matthias Wollong (born 31 December 1968) is a German violinist.

Career 

Born in Berlin, Wollong began playing the violin at the age of five. After training in the master class of Werner Scholz, he went to Switzerland from 1987 to 1989 to study with violinist and pedagogue Tibor Varga. During this time, he performed as a soloist in the Federal Republic, France and Switzerland. He ended his studies there by winning the violin competition named after his teacher. Further prizes followed, such as the main prize at the "Joseph Joachim" violin competition in Austria.

As a soloist he has worked with the conductors Ádám Fischer, Rafael Frühbeck de Burgos, Marek Janowski, Vladimir Jurowski and Colin Davis and the Vienna Radio Symphony Orchestra, the Berlin Radio Symphony Orchestra, the Staatskapelle Dresden, the Berliner Symphoniker and the Deutsches Nationaltheater und Staatskapelle Weimar.

In his younger years he was a member of the Gustav Mahler Youth Orchestra. Since 1999, Wollong has been 1st concertmaster of the Sächsische Staatskapelle, after holding the same position with the Rundfunk-Sinfonieorchester Berlin from 1991 to 1999. During the summer months, he plays as 1st concertmaster in the orchestra of the Bayreuth Festival.

Wollong devotes himself intensively to chamber music. He has performed in various formations at the Salzburg Easter Festival and at the International Shostakovich Days Gohrisch. As a chamber musician, he has released radio and CD recordings, such as the complete works for violin by Othmar Schoeck and Wilhelm Furtwängler, the piano trios by Johannes Brahms and Ludwig van Beethoven (Genuin). In 2008 he received an "Echo Klassik" for the recording of chamber music by Erich Wolfgang Korngold.

Since 2003, he has had an ongoing collaboration as conductor and soloist with the European Union Chamber Orchestra, with whom he has toured Europe, the Far East and North and South America.

As a conductor, he has led the German Chamber Orchestra, the Thüringen Philharmonie Gotha-Eisenach and made guest appearances with the Cairo Symphony Orchestra.

Wollong has a professorship at the Hochschule für Musik Franz Liszt, Weimar where he also lives. He plays on a violin by Andrea Guarneri from 1676.

Recordings

References

External links 
 
 

German classical violinists
Academic staff of the Hochschule für Musik Franz Liszt, Weimar
Echo (music award) winners
1968 births
Living people
Musicians from Berlin